Primary Suspect is a 2000 American action-thriller-mystery film written by D.Alvelo and Marc Bienstock and directed by Jeff Celentano. The film stars William Baldwin, Brigitte Bako, and Lee Majors.

Plot
While on an undercover infiltration mission, Denver police detective Christian Box played by William Baldwin has to use some drugs, and is believed by many to have become an addict; it goes wrong, and his wife, also on the operation, is killed and Christian Box gets blamed. Thanks to Lieutenant Blake played by Lee Majors, Box is not officially charged, but instead is demoted to desk work. Two years later he grabs a unique opportunity to mount a new, Box goes on a personal mission to destroy his wife's killer.

Cast
William Baldwin as Christian Box
Brigitte Bako as Nikki
Lee Majors as Lt. Blake
Vincent Castellanos as Reuben
Tim Ryan as Nemanski
John Fleck as Timothy
Robert Madrid as Detective Rudd
Nikita Ager as Gwen
Donre Sampson as Franco
Audra Lea Keener as Melissa the Call Girl
Serene Begum as Kenna Box
Jeff Olson as Capt. Aronson

References

External links

2000 films
2000 action thriller films
2000s mystery thriller films
2000s American films
2000s English-language films
American action thriller films
American mystery thriller films
Films directed by Jeff Celentano